Fu Lei (born 7 May 1950) is a Taiwanese actor.

Filmography (incomplete)

Films

TV Dramas

Awards and nominations

References
 馬英九初中照曝光演員傅雷同窗

External links

 

Living people
Taiwanese male film actors
Taiwanese male television actors
21st-century Taiwanese male actors
20th-century Taiwanese male actors
1950 births